Col. Henry Hewitt Wood House is a historic home located at Charleston, West Virginia.  It is a two-story, white- painted brick house was formerly the seat of a large farmland and built in 1829-31 for Colonel Henry Hewitt Wood, a leading saltmaker.  It is a slightly modified "L" shaped dwelling. The major elevation facing the Kanawha River is symmetrically divided among five bays and is centered with an especially broad entrance.

It was listed on the National Register of Historic Places in 1980.

References

Houses in Charleston, West Virginia
Federal architecture in West Virginia
Houses completed in 1831
Houses on the National Register of Historic Places in West Virginia
National Register of Historic Places in Charleston, West Virginia